Lebak, officially the Municipality of Lebak  (Jawi: ايڠايد نو ليبق), is a 1st class municipality in the province of Sultan Kudarat, Philippines. According to the 2020 census, it has a population of 88,868.

It is a coastal municipality that lies in the northernmost part of the province.

Etymology
Lebak is a Maguindanaon word meaning hollow. This is because of the eastern part of Lebak is a mountain and on the western part is the Celebes Sea thus the hollow portion is between a mountain and the sea.

History
Early settlers are the Manobo at Salangsang. Anthropomorphic urn burials of limestone and some pottery were found in Seminoho Cave dates back to AD 585. Manobos way of life was intact until the Teduray settlers arrived in the 1950s.

Sultanate era
Lebak was once part of Sultanate of Maguindanao.The arrival of Maguindanao which establish the Islamic faith and settled in near the rivers and shores in the 15th century.

Spanish era
This territory was part of the Spanish Empire in Asia and Oceania (1520–1898). By 1696, Captain Rodríguez de Figueroa obtained from the Spanish government the exclusive right to colonize Mindanao. On February 1 of this year, Iloilo reached the mouth of the Rio Grande of Mindanao, in what is now known as the city of Cotabato.

The first written history of this town was in 1871, The colonial government of Spain, Lebac was made into a military district of Cotabato. The military campaign of Emilio Terrero y Perinat against Sultan reaches Lebak in 1887.

American period
By the end of the Spanish regime in 1898, includes politico-military comendancia of Lebak in "Fifth District of Mindanao". The town already producing rice during the period of 1905 and vinta was already in service from Cotabato to Lebac. In 1913 Under the United States ended the military rule in Mindanao and establish the Department of Mindanao and Sulu. Act No. 2711 of the Philippine Commission dated March 10, 1917, Lebak and Salaman was incorporated into Province of Cotabato. The growing agrarian problem in Luzon and Visayas offers United States government offers the solution of homestead and resettlement in Mindanao particularly in Lebak. Act 2408 enacted on July 23, 1914, Lebak was part of Empire Province of Cotabato. Between the time between 1914 and 1937 a steady flow of Christian settlers from Luzon (Ilocanos) and Visayas (Ilongos).

World War II and Japanese occupation
In 1945, World War II when the combined American and Filipino forces took over the supervision of the Philippine Government against Japanese occupation, Marcelino A. Concha was still the Military Governor of the Empire Province of Cotabato. In the same year, Aurelio Freires, Sr. was appointed Municipal District Mayor of Salaman.

Post colonial (third republic) and creation of Lebak
On August 18, 1947, President Manuel Roxas sign an executive order 82 organizing municipalities and municipal district of Cotabato Province. The municipal district of Lebak was formally created under the municipal district of Kiamba under section 4, however, on same executive order on section 10 the municipal district of Salaman was under the Municipality of Dinaig. Together with the Kalamansig, Salaman was formerly a part of the municipality of once called Lebak and the seat of government is in now called Kalamansig Municipal Hall.

An executive order number 195, the Municipality of Lebak as separated from the municipality of district of Kiamba and Dinaig and upholding the seat of government at Sito Kalamansig was signed by President Elpidio Quirino on December 31, 1948. and on April 12, 1951, and an executive order 432 issued to transfer the seat of government from Kalamansig to Barrio of Salaman.

On April 12, 1951, the municipality of Kalamansig is formally created consisting of 20 barrios and sitios from Lebak.

Moro conflict

The Land Reform Code of Diosdado Macapagal brought more Christian migrants from Luzon and Visayas.

Under the command of Rajah Buayan, Commander Ali “Cassius Clay” Sansaluna of Cotabato Moro National Liberation Front Command landed at barangay Tran in December 1972 with an estimated 5,000 – 6,000 armed with European made weapon ship from neighboring Muslims countries. Tran was the main logistical base of the MNLF's Cotabato Command. Early February 26, 1973, the hostilities began when a group of fishermen at Tran River was shot and killed. The following day, February 27, 1973, the 54 Philippine Constabulary verify the event and the skirmishes begin. Signalled the MNLF offensive all over Cotabato raided including Civilian Home Defense Forces (CHDFs), 27th Infantry Battalion, PC Provincial Commands and villages as far as barangay Basak.

22nd Infantry Battalion (Separate) was deployed at Lebak in April 1973.

Datu Guiwan Mastura withdraws from Lebak and Kalamansig and seeks sanctuary at Palimbang on March 21, 1973. Tran was guarded with 600 rebels under the command of Datu Sangki Karon.

Offensive military operation started June 6, 1973, under the command of Unified Central Mindanao Command (CEMCOM) Task Force COSMOS under General Fortunato U. Abat who was the commanding general of 3rd Inf Bde (Sep) PA. Units include 21st, the 22nd and the 4th Infantry Battalions PA, the 1st Composite Infantry Battalion, GHQ, the 554th and 531st Philippine Constabulary Companies and four ships of the Naval task Group 71.1, and Composite Air Support Force Cotabato

July 21, 1973, government troops controlled the Barangay Tran and kept pushing towards Sitio Turugan. A thousand rebels together with their families surrendered to government troops on August 3, 1973. On August 4, 1972, the 22nd Infantry Battalion finally cleared the Sitio Turugan, the Moro National Liberation Front stronghold. The Tran Offensive officially ended on August 6, 1973, ending the two-month conflict.

Leader of Tran insurgents Datu Guiwan Mastura together with 12 men surrendered to Ferdinand Marcos in June 1973. First Presidential Streamer Award was awarded to 22nd Infantry Battalion in 1973. On the side of MNLF, 422 killed, 39 captured and 1,036 surrendered. The government troops counts 48 killed in action, 148 wounded and 1 missing including Lieutenant Gringo Honasan was one of the wounded of this battle and was later awarded with 3 Gold Cross Medal.

Post war and 1976 tsunami disaster

It was followed by 15 aftershocks. The quake triggered a 9-meter tsunami that killed an estimated 8,000 people in the affected region.

A few years later, the municipality of Lebak was transferred from Cotabato Province to Province of Sultan Kudarat on November 22, 1979, by presidential decree 341 by President Ferdinand E. Marcos.

Fifth republic

The municipality was formerly composed of 23 barangays and created 4 new barangays, Bolebak, Barurao II, Poblacion II and Poblacion III making it to 27 barangays.

The renaming of Poblacion 2 to barangay Aurelio F. Frieres Sr was approved by the Sanguniang Bayan in its resolution number 007 series of 2002. A plebiscite was enacted last March 31, 2005.

Geography

It is located on the western portion of the Province of Sultan kudarat, and bordered in the north by South Upi, Maguindanao; in the south by Kalamansig; in the west by Celebes Sea; in the east by Esperanza.

Lebak is marked with hilly, mountainous ranges. It is about eight feet above sea level. The plains range from level to nearly level while uplands range from nearly level to hilly. Mountainous and gently rolling slopes are suitable for intensive rice and corn farming.

The Tran River is the longest river in Lebak with a total length of  followed by Salaman River  and Nuling River (Barurao) .

The approximate land area of the municipality of Lebak as of December 31, 1999, is 514.034445 square kilometers. But for planning purposes, the area used is 47,000 hectares, pursuant to the DBM supported by the Land Management Bureau/ Bureau of Lands.

Topography

List of peaks in Lebak by elevation

Mount Salangsang 3,379 ft (1,030 m)
Mount Tona 2,001 ft (610 m)
Mount Klomono 1,509 ft (460 m)
Mount Luho 853 ft (260 m)
Mount Balanganan 722 ft (220 m)
Mount Pansud 525 ft (160 m)

Land Formation

Lebak is marked with hilly, mountainous ranges. The plains range from level to nearly level while uplands range from nearly level to hilly mountainous and gently rolling slopes which are suitable for intensive rice and corn farming. Silty Loam which is best suited for agricultural crops such as rice, corn and vegetables. This covers 37.36% or 17,500 has of the total land area.
Soils Un-differentiated which is favorable suited to grazing, pasture, forest and agro-forestry. This covers a total of 29,440 has or 62.64%.

Hydrology/ natural resources
The Municipality is rich in natural resources. Its fishing ground abounds with fish of various species for domestic consumption and export. Marine products bring substantial income to a marginal fisherman. Fishing grounds are practically untapped. Identified watershed areas are Barurao Watershed (6,817.62), Salaman Watershed (8,176 ha.), Tran-Sucong Watershed (8,518.65) and Tran River Watershed (10,230 Ha.).

Groundwater information

The water resources of Lebak consist of Tran River , Salaman River , and Barurao River  the Makin and Ebi Waterfalls, Nuling, Salangsang and Ebi Springs. Some are tapped for irrigation and other purposes.

Climate

Under the Köppen climate classification system, the municipality of Lebak features a tropical rainforest climate. Together with the rest of the Philippines, Lebak has a mild climate with evenly distributed rainfall throughout the year. Being located outside of the typhoon path, it does not experience tropical depressions, typhoons and devastating winds. 
Mean relative humidity for the Municipality of Lebak is 87%. The highest humidity is 89.5% and the lowest is 83.6%.

The municipality of Lebak falls under TYPE IV classification. Rainfall is more or less evenly distributed throughout the year. Prevailing winds- light to moderate.

Mean, Maximum and Minimum Temperature ( °C ):

Barangays

Lebak is politically subdivided into 27 barangays.

Datu Guiabar is a newly created barangay carved out from barangay Poloy-poloy. It is not officially recognized until plebiscite is held.

Demographics

The population of Lebak by age group reveals a dominance of the young population. Based on the 2007 population, children under five years old made up 14% or 11,163 of the total population of the municipality, lower than the percentage for the age group 5 – 9 which is 14.67% or 11,234 of the same year.

Child dependency ratio registered at 78.73% meaning 78 children dependents for every 100 working population. Total dependency ratio is 84.15%, the higher the total dependency ratio, the heavier the burden of the working age population.

Economically dependent persons less than 15 years old are about 32,979 or 42.75%, Working age population registered 41,888 or 54.23% are between the ages 15–64.

The percentage of female population in the reproductive age (15–49) registered 36,534 or 47.28%. About 47,436 or 61.51% of both men and women belonged to the age group 24 years and below. The population by age group declines with increase in age.

The population of those belonging to ages 65 years and over or the elderly population constitutes a very small proportion of the population. Population age 65 and above constitutes 2,272 or 5.4% of the total population. Old age dependency ratio is 5.4%, meaning for every 100 working population there are 5 old age dependent persons.

The working age group of 15 to 64 years old makes up 54% or 41,888 of the population while 43% or 32,979 are 14 years or younger and 5% or 2,272 are 65 years old or above.

Male population in the municipality is slightly higher than that of the female. The same is true in all barangays. Male population registered a total of 39,958 or 51.80% and 37,181 or 48.20%. The municipality is predominated by males showing males per 100 females.

Religion
There are 4 major religious groups in the municipality of Lebak. These are the Roman Catholic which accounts for 62% of the total population, Islam, 15%, Protestants, 8% and UCCP, 7%. The remaining percentage is distributed to Evangelical, United Pentecostal Church and other religions which make up 8%.

Languages
The most widely spoken language is Hiligaynon (41.06%), followed by Karay-a (12.98%), Maguindanaon (12.91%), Cebuano (9.42%), Teduray (8.08%), Ilocano (7%), Manobo (5.74%), and 4.57% for other languages.

Economy

This municipality managed to boost its local economy to its full potential. Saturday market was started as early as the 1960s and the market days still observe today. The opening of new routes and improvement in transport system are expect to deliver the town into an economic promise. Strengthen inter-regional trade linkage, gain access to potential agricultural production and will support various economic activities in the adjacent areas.

The 2016, National Competitiveness Council shows that the size of the local economy has total registered business gross sales of Php. 789,977,450.84.

Agriculture Sector
Agriculture is the primary source of income. Corn, rice and coconut are the most extensive crops grown. Cacao most commonly intercropped with coconut while the coffee is still a major crop.

Livestock like swine/hog, ducks, cattle, carabao, goat and poultry products, fruits and vegetables.

Fishing
Coastal barangay like Salaman, Tibpuan, Kinudalan, Datu Karon and Taguisa rely on fishing as their livelihood.

Lebak is known for its produce like crabs (alimango), prawns (sugpo), milkfish (bangus) on its total of 247 Has. of shallow ponds. Shell fish are also abundant in shallow areas.

Communication
Smart Communications provide services like wireless 3G connection and broadband connection on its Smart Bro product. While Globe Telecom offers 3G and HSDPA signal that boost mobile internet connectivity. Some complain of unstable and frequent disconnection on Globe Tattoo and WiMax services. Fixed telephone line are provided by the Sultan Kudarat Telephone System Incorporated (SKTSI) subsidiary of PLDT.

FM station is also present in Lebak. The 105.1 MHz DXLR Radyo Natin of the Manila Broadcasting Company broadcast local news and advertisements with power of 500 Watts
Kalamansig-Lebak Cable System, Inc. (KALECA) carries cable television signal to barangay Poblacion, Salaman, Pasandalan, Tibpuan, Barurao 1 & 2, Purikay and far as barangay Pansud. Direct-To-Home satellite TV such as G Sat, Cignal and Dream are common in the rural areas.

Banking, Financial and Utility Services

Banking
With total of 27 financial institutions includes 1 commercial banks and 2 rural banks, 5 finance cooperatives, 9 pawnshops, 2 foreign exchange dealers, 6 remittance centers and 2 microfinance institutions.
3 automated teller machines (ATMs) operated by Land Bank of the Philippines and One Network Bank.

Water Utilities
Local water utilities are supplied by Lebak Water District (LEWADI) with a rate of Php. 55.2/Per Cubic Meter.

Energy
As of March 31, 2017 Sultan Kudarat Electric Cooperative (SUKELCO) provides electricity for 70% of the residents. The electric distribution company energized all 27 barangays (100%), 264 sitios (57%) with 6,457 member-consumer and 14,693 connections. The average cost of Php 6.7/KwH for commercial and industrial users. SUKELCO Lebak is in constant power interruption and unreliable service. Several complaints like rude employee including its security guards pretending to be a manager of the power cooperative.

Culture
Lebak is a melting pot of culture and tradition. Mainstream culture of Lebak is the Ilonggo, the greatest number of the populace. Maguindanaon and tribal traditions can still be observed on its local settlements. Manobos and Tiduray minorities still widely practice and observe. Part of the culture of the people of Lebak is the celebration of Fiesta. Patronal Fiesta Celebration every 4th Sunday of May. Some barangays has its own festival like in Basak, Taguisa, Villamonte, Salangsang, Keytodac and Tibpuan.

The Araw ng Lebak is celebrated during August 18 yearly and the Kapeonan Festival.

Tourism

Lebak is now an emerging tourism destination. The beautiful beaches stretch 22 kilometers with lined mangroves from Barangay Salaman, Tibpuan and Kinudalan, Taguisa and Datu Karon. A number of a beach resort is now existing in this coastal barangays.

Enchanting Makin falls in Villamonte, Tres Andanas falls in New Calinog and Ragandang falls are part of series of seven waterfalls can be found in Lebak.

The network of caves can also be found in Salangsang, Keytodac, Bululawan and Capilan. The most popular are Camilmil pit,  Lom cave, Kiangus pit and, Sataluday cave, Capilan Bat cave and Tinubak cave and falls in Keytodac consist of class II cave, underground river and jump into a falls

Hot Spring located in Nuling are another big things in Lebak's tourism industry .

Lebak Katunggan Eco Park at barangay Taguisa is the newly opened tourist attraction in the municipality. This 720 hectares of estuarine is a home to 26 species of mangroves become a sanctuary for birds, fish, crustaceans and shellfish species. The dedicated 237 hectares for eco-tourism park which includes the beach, rivers, sandbars with developments like 1.6 kilometers of a bamboo boardwalk, forest ranger station, cottages. Tourist will surely enjoy the activities like beach, swimming, beach volleyball, educational tour, boating on both estuarine and sea, and adventures.

Government

List of former chief executives
 Aurelio F. Freires, Sr. 1948–1955
 Timoteo P. Belarmino 1956–1959
 Aurelio F. Freires, Sr. 1960–1963
 Aurelio C. Freires, Jr. 1964–1967
 Jorge T. Labog 1968–1971
 Romeo F. Almirante 1972–1975
 Reynaldo P. Palileo, Sr. 1976–1979
 Romeo F. Almirante 1980–1986 (died in office)
 Salvador G. Ang, MD 1986–1987 (appointed)
 David Gestosani 1987–1988 (appointed)
 Sergio P. Sabio 1988–1998
 Kahirup C. Ang, M.D. 1998–2003
 Gerardo S. Delasan 2003–2010
 Dionesio Besana 2010–2019
 Frederick Celestial 2019–Present

Transportation

Lebak has a road network of 219.35 kilometers and 37.85 km are concrete, 111.5 km graveled road and 70 km of unpaved roads. The distance to the nearest airport (Awang Domestic Airport) is 53.99 km.

Transportation from and to the muicipalites was already in place since 1925. Early hydrography made by steamer Pathfinder on February 4 until end of July 1914.

The lack of access to road Lebak was isolated for many years.  These are Construction and Improvement of Awang-Upi-Lebak-Kalamansig Road, the Isulan – Bagumbayan, Senator Ninoy Aquino – Lebak Road, the planned Lebak-Kalamansig-Bagumbayan-Maitum Road.Transport of goods from and into the town was very difficult and tricky before. Rough road to Isulan by provincial road sometimes take 1 day. The shipping from Port of Cotabato to Lebak by motorboat locally called lantsa (an engine powered small boat) also took 12 hours of travel.

If you are from Manila, you can reach Lebak by plain via Manila-Gensan or Manila- Cotabato. The completion of the concrete national road from the junction of Awang — Upi — Lebak road will be a great impact on the economy of Lebak.
It can be reached by Public Utility Jeep, vans and private vehicles for about 8 to 12 hours to and from Isulan and for about 5 hours via Cotabato City, the nearest city.  Several Utility Van (UV Express) in Davao City, General Santos, Tacurong City, Cotabato City and Isulan have routes for Lebak.

Local transportation includes UV express, motor vehicles, trucks, modified motorcycle (habal-habal or skylab) and even horseback riding are common in some area. Motorboats are also available in coastal areas.
This municipality has two airstrips: Lebak Municipal Airport (IATA: LWA ), just 4 kilometers located at Kumalawit, Barangay Purikay is already concreted and will be fully operational accommodating from Cessna, turboprop to Airbus A320.

Another way of reaching this municipality is by the sea. The existing Port of Lebak which is 9 km in nearby municipality of Kalamansig.

Education
The town has total of 10 secondary schools, 2 in private and 8 public schools. Literacy rate is at 93% and mostly having a secondary education.

Elementary education is divided into three districts: East, Central and West. These districts in total comprise the 11 primary schools, 26 elementary schools and three central schools of Lebak.

Public High School
E. Arcaño Mem. National High School (Basak National High School)
Lebak Legislated National High School
Purikay National High School
Tran National High School
Keytodac National High School
Mangudadatu National High School

Private High School
Salaman Institute (SI)
Notre Dame of Salaman College (NDSC) (High School)

Vocational and Tertiary Education
Notre Dame of Salaman College
Salaman Institute
West Celebes College of Technology, Inc.
Lebak Family Doctors Hospital and School of Midwifery

List of Elementary School (Elementary School) and Primary School (Primary School)

Lebak East District – 11 Schools
 Babato Primary School
Bolibak Elementary School
Christianuevo Primary School
Datu Karon Elementary School
Don M. Concha MElementary School (Taguisa Elementary School)
Nuling Elementary School
Pansud Elementary School
Purikay Central School
Tapudi Elementary School
Tinonggos Elementary School
Tran Elementary School

Lebak Central District – 13 Schools
Adalla Primary School
Bululawan Primary School
Capilan Elementary School
Dimapitan Elementary School
Elem Primary School
F. Parohinog MElementary School (Basak Elementary School)
Keytodac Central Elementary School
Kimakang Primary School
New Calinog Elementary School
S.A. Balabagan Primary School
Salangsang Elementary School
Tibong-tibong Primary School
Villamonte Elementary School

Lebak West District – 11 Schools
Ampad-Guibar MElementary School
B. Difunturom MElementary School (Poloy-Poloy Elementary School)
Barurao Elementary School
Gestosani Mem. Elementary School
Guintales Primary School
Kinudalan Elementary School
Lagandang Elementary School
Nabagbag Primary School
Pasandalan Elementary School
Posadas Primary School
Salaman Central Elementary School

Healthcare
The health services are categorized into two. Public health services and private health services. The capacity of public health services are 3 doctors, 16 nurses, 30 midwives with 28 health centers and the private services have 7, nurses 16 and 11 midwives with 6 clinics and 2 hospitals.
Lebak Doctors Hospital
Lebak Santo Niño Hospital
Lebak Medical Group of Hospital
Medicare Community Hospital of Lebak
Lebak Family Doctors Hospital
Sabio Medical Clinic
Municipal Health Center (Birthing Section)
Labian Medical Clinic

Sister cities
 City of Makati 
 Cotabato City

See also

History of the Philippines

References

External links

Lebak Profile at PhilAtlas.com
Lebak Profile at the DTI Cities and Municipalities Competitive Index
[ Philippine Standard Geographic Code]
Philippine Census Information
Local Governance Performance Management System

Municipalities of Sultan Kudarat
Establishments by Philippine executive order